Firing Squad is the second studio album by the American hip hop duo M.O.P., from Brownsville, New York. It was released on October 22, 1996, via Relativity Records. It was produced by DJ Premier, Big Jaz, Ali Dee, M.O.P. & Laze E Laze and it also features a guest appearance from Kool G Rap. The whole album was mixed and overseen by DJ Premier, who continued the work for the next two M.O.P. albums. The album is broken down track-by-track by M.O.P. in Brian Coleman's book Check the Technique.

Track listing

Charts

References

1996 albums
M.O.P. albums
Albums produced by DJ Premier
Albums produced by Jaz-O